Wang Zhenpeng may refer to:
 Wang Zhenpeng (painter), Chinese landscape painter during the Yuan Dynasty (1271–1368)
 Wang Zhenpeng (footballer), Chinese footballer, current member of Kitchee SC